Omalium allardii is a species of beetle belonging to the family Staphylinidae.

It is native to Western Europe.

Synonym:
 Omalium allardi

References

Staphylinidae
Beetles described in 1859